Faroese grammar is related and very similar to that of Icelandic. Faroese is an inflected language with three grammatical genders and four cases: nominative, accusative, dative and genitive.

Noun inflection
Below is a representation of three grammatical genders, two numbers and four cases in the nominal inflection. This is just an overview to give a general idea of how the grammar works. Faroese actually has even more declensions. In modern Faroese, the genitive has a very limited use (and possession is mostly expressed with various prepositional phrases instead). For most native speakers, the genitive is a learned and somewhat stilted form as opposed to the other cases which are learned naturally in regular colloquial situations.

Read:
hvør, hvat? interrogative pronoun "who, what?"
ein indefinite article "a"
stórur adjective "big"
bátur noun "boat"
ein stórur bátur – a big boat (m.)
ein vøkur genta – a beautiful girl (f.)
eitt gott barn – a good child (n.)

In the plural you will see that even the numeral tvey (2) is inflected.

If the noun is definite, the adjective inflects weak, and the noun gets a suffix article as in any Scandinavian language (although Icelandic does not generally need a pre-posed definite article in this construction).

The interrogative pronoun is the same as above. In the plural, the plural form of the definite article is used.

Read:
tann stóri báturin – the big boat-the
tann vakra gentan – the beautiful girl-the
tað góða barnið – the good child-the

Personal Pronouns
The personal pronouns of Faroese are:

Singular
1st person: eg  – I, meg  – me (acc.), mær  – me (dat.), mín  – my
2nd person: tú  – you, teg  – you (acc.), tær  – you (dat.), tín  – your (gen.)
3rd person masculine: hann  – he, him (nom., acc.), honum  – him (dat.), hansara  – his (gen.)
3rd person feminine: hon  – she, hana  – her (acc.), henni  – her (dat.), hennara  – her (gen.)
3rd person neuter: tað  – it (nom., acc.), tí  – it (dat.), tess  – its (gen.)
Plural
1st person: vit  – we, okkum  – us (acc., dat.), okkara  – our (gen.)
2nd person: tit  – you (pl.), tykkum  – you (acc., dat. pl.) tykkara  – your (gen. pl.)
3rd person masculine: teir ~ – they, them (m. nom., acc.), teimum ~ – them (dat.), teirra ~ – their (gen.)
3rd person feminine: tær  – they, them (f. nom., acc.)
3rd person neuter: tey  – they, them (n. nom., acc.)

The 3rd person plural neuter tey will be used in all cases when both genders are meant, as in:

teir eru onglendingar – they are Englishmen (about males)
tær eru føroyingar – they are Faroese (about females)
tey eru fólk úr Evropa – they are people from Europe (both sexes)

Verbs

Weak Inflection
There are 4 classes of weak inflection of verbs (with some underclasses). E.g.:
stem-final -a, 2–3.pers.sg. -r – kalla! (imperative), tú/hann kalla-r (you/he call(s))
2–3.pers.sg. -ur – tú/hann selur (you/he sell(s))
2–3.pers.sg. -ir – tú/hann dømir (you/he judge(s))
2. pers.sg. -rt – tú rørt (you row). In certain surroundings, skerping occurs: eg rógvi , I row; vs. eg róði , I rowed.

Strong Inflection
These verbs are also referred to as regular. There are 7 classes (with underclasses), distinguished by the variations of the stem-vowel:
í – í – ei – i- i; – at bíta – hann bítur – hann beit – teir bitu – teir hava bitið (bite)
ó/ú – ý – ey – u- o; – at bróta – hann brýtur – hann breyt – teir brutu – teir hava brotið (break)
e/i/ø – i – a – u- o/u; – at svimja – hann svimur – hann svam – teir svumu – teir hava svomið (swim)
e/o – e – a – ó – o; – at bera – hann ber – hann bar – teir bóru – teir hava borið (bear)
o – e – o – o – o; – at koma – hann kemur – hann kom – teir komu – teir hava komið (come)
e/i – e/i – a/á – ó – i; – at liggja – hann liggur – hann lá – teir lógu – teir hava ligið (lie)
a – e – ó – ó – a; – at fara – hann fer – hann fór – teir fóru – teir hava farið (go)
a/á – æ – e – i – i; – at fáa – hann fær – hann fekk – teir fingu – teir hava fingið (get)

Auxiliary verbs
The auxiliary verbs in Faroese are:

at vera – to be
at hava – to have
at verða – to be, become
at blíva – to be, become

Note, that vera and verða are homonyms.

Preterite-present verbs
The preterite-present verbs in Faroese are the following:
at kunna – to be able to
at munna – to want
at mega – to be allowed to
at skula – shall
at vita – to know
at vilja – to want

Adjectives
Most adjectives inflect for gender, number, case and definitiveness, and for positive, comparative and superlative.

Adverbs
Many adverbs inflect in positive, comparative and superlative.

External links 
 Faroese online syntactic analyser and morphological analyser/generator

 

Grammar
North Germanic grammars